Persib Bandung U-18 is an Indonesian football team in Bandung, West Java, Indonesia. They are the reserve team from Persib Bandung. Their most common nickname is Maung Ngora (The Young Tigers). They play their home matches at Si Jalak Harupat Stadium and Siliwangi Stadium

They were runners-up in the 2017 Liga 1 U-19 after losing to Persipura Jayapura U-19 1-0 in the final. They won the title on 26 November 2018 after defeating Persija Jakarta U-19 1-0 in the final.

Honours 
Liga 1 U-19 
 Champions: 2018
 Runner-up: 2017
 Soeratin Cup Champions (2):''' 2003, 2006

References

External links 
 Official site 

Football clubs in Indonesia
Persib Bandung